Arena International Motorsport was a British motor racing team founded by Mike Earle. Earle originally ran the Onyx Formula One team from the same base in Littlehampton, before selling the team. At the end of 2012 the team's new owners, Capsicum Racing Limited, placed the company into CVA.

Earle also created 3001 International and Grand Prix Design, which later morphed into Arena International Motorsport. The team made their racing debut in the British Touring Car Championship in 1999, where they ran for many years before moving to become a factory-supported Zytek sports car team in the Le Mans Series in 2007. They returned to the BTCC running the Team Aon operation, until switching to the World Touring Car Championship for the 2012 season.

BTCC

Renault Laguna (1999)
Arena's first season saw the team running a year-old Renault Laguna for Russell Spence, who was later replaced by Will Hoy.  The team then disappeared from the series.

Honda and Team Honda (2001–2005)
In 2001 Arena approached Honda about running a Civic on an independent basis.  However, Honda chose to give the team full manufacturer backing for the 2002 season, with Alan Morrison and Andy Priaulx driving.  There was some initial success, and in 2003 newcomer Matt Neal finished third in the standings for them, in what was Arena's best year in the BTCC with six wins and finishing second in the Teams' and Manufacturers' Championships.
However Honda chose to reduce their support, leaving Arena  running a single car for Tom Chilton in 2004 and claim two wins. Honda's support was gone altogether in 2005 but despite missing the opening and closing meetings of the year Chilton went on to take four wins in the campaign before they decided to sell off their Civic to Fast-Tec Motorsport, although Arena provided some assistance with setting up the car.  Arena then moved on to a full-time sports car team.

Team Aon Ford Focus (2009–2011)

On 25 November 2008, Arena Motorsport announced it would be running a pair of Ford Focus STs for the 2009 season. The team's lead driver was Tom Chilton along with Alan Morrison also returning, running under the Team Aon banner (Aon Corporation being their primary sponsor). Morrison left the team during the season and was replaced in certain rounds by Tom Onslow-Cole. The team struggled with the car at the beginning of the season, but were on the pace at the end of the year. For 2010, the cars will run under LPG-power from Calor, with Chilton and Onslow-Cole continuing as drivers. They saw a massive leap in performance. Winning 7 races & securing 4th & 5th in the drivers championship & 2nd in the teams championship.

D.C. = Drivers' Championship position, T.C. = Teams' Championship position.

WTCC

The team switched to the World Touring Car Championship for 2012, with Tom Chilton and James Nash driving. The season was unsuccessful, with the car struggling for pace during the majority of the season.

This season would turn out to be the team's last, as during the final weeks of 2012, the team was formally closed.

Sports car racing
In 2001, Arena ran the Gulf branded Audi R8 in the European Le Mans Series and at Le Mans for Johansson Racing. The drivers Stefan Johansson, Patrick Lemarié and Tom Coronel were unsuccessful at Le Mans but the team did win the European Le Mans Series championship that year.

In 2003, Arena chose to enter sports car racing, being chosen to represent Audi Sport UK.  The team would run an Audi R8 at the 12 Hours of Sebring and 24 Hours of Le Mans.  A driving team of Mika Salo, Jonny Kane, and Perry McCarthy were able to take sixth place at Sebring, but the team's fortune at Le Mans turned sour as Frank Biela mistakenly missed his pit stop and ran out of fuel early in the race.

For 2004, Arena initially planned to run a privateer Dome prototype at Le Mans, but the plan did not come together and their entry was withdrawn.  A second attempt in 2005 with a new Zytek also did not occur.  Finally, in 2007, Arena was able to purchase a Zytek 07S, with plans to enter the full Le Mans Series season as the factory squad in LMP1 with Tom Chilton and Hayanari Shimoda.

Arena's 2007 effort would suffer mechanical setbacks early, with the team struggling to finish races due to throttle cable linkage failures.  The team was also forced to withdraw from Le Mans when a heavy accident during testing damage the car so badly that repairs could not be completed in the two weeks prior to the race.  Arena was however able to finish in eighth place at the Nürburgring, earning them their first points of the season.

T.C. = Teams' Championship position.

Formulas
In 2006–07, Arena joined the young A1 Grand Prix series managing both A1 Team India and A1 Team Greece but this last one didn't race all season.

Arena were involved in 2007 in British Formula 3 Championship with Max Chilton without success.

D.C. = Drivers' Championship position, T.C. = Teams' Championship position.

References

External links
 Arena International Motorsport
 Team Aon

British auto racing teams
British Touring Car Championship teams
A1 Grand Prix racing teams
24 Hours of Le Mans teams
European Le Mans Series teams
British Formula Three teams
World Touring Car Championship teams
Auto racing teams established in 1999
Auto racing teams disestablished in 2012
1999 establishments in the United Kingdom
American Le Mans Series teams
2012 disestablishments in the United Kingdom